Olga Novikova may refer to:
 Olga Novikova (orienteer)
 Olga Novikova (footballer)
 Olga Novikova (luger)